VéloSoleX is a moped, or motorised bicycle, usually just referred to as 'Solex', which was originally produced by the French manufacturer Solex, based in Courbevoie near Paris, France. The company manufactured centrifugal radiators, carburetors, and micrometers, before branching into assist motors and bicycles. The moped originally created during World War II and mass-produced between 1946 and 1988 came in various iterations, whilst keeping the same concept of a motor with roller resting on the front wheel of a bicycle.

Referred to the company's advertisement as the 'bicycle which drives itself' (« la bicyclette qui roule toute seule »), it became extremely popular with school children, students or plant workers because it was light and extremely economical.

Ownership
Owned successively by Dassault, Renault, Motobécane/MBK, VéloSoleX sold more than 7 million units worldwide before ceasing production in France in 1988. Production of the VéloSoleX restarted in both China and Hungary after 1988, but production ceased in Hungary in 2002. VéloSoleX is now manufactured in France.

History
The Solex motorized bicycle was conceived during World War II and marketed in 1946, with 8 million being sold between 1946 and 1988 in France and internationally, having been marketed in some 70 countries. The French design ceased production in 1988. It lived on for almost two decades as a licensed design produced in China and Hungary. Production returned to France in 2005, and  the S4800 model was being marketed by VeloSolex America in North Bergen, New Jersey.

Models and modifications
 1941: Prototype created of which only a few remain, based on a bicycle
 1946: A 45 cc model, of which many evolutions were made, with a  engine developing  and no clutch, the engine has to be restarted every time the rider comes to a stop
 1953: Model 330 with a  engine and  using the same frame as the 45 but boosting power
 1955: Model 660 with a new dedicated bicycle frame, but an unchanged engine
 1957: Model 1010 updates the engine
 1958: Model 1400
 1959: Model 1700 uses the same frame as the previous version but introduce an automatic clutch and air cooling of the engine
 1964: Model S3300 with a new square tube frame which will remain the same until end of production, adds a drum brake on the rear wheel
 1966: Model S3800, which is the most common and most sold version of the brand over the years, later a Luxure or 'Luxe' version "S3800 luxe" and "S3800 super luxe" introduce color to the frame which was always black (including the motor) until then, as well as having large wheels with blackwall tires. In 1968, the twist grip appear allowing to reduce throttle at stops
 A smaller (children's) version is produced, the F4 with a replica plastic motor emitting clicking sounds to replicate the adult version
 1968: the Micron, which has very small wheels and no pedals. A three wheel version would be produced in small numbers for children
 1971: Model 5000, which has an upgraded kickstand, a white motor instead of a black one, smaller wheels than the 3800 with whitewall tires instead of blackwall tires, and is available in only four colors (yellow, blue, orange and white)
 1973: The Plisolex arrives, it is a folding version of the Model 5000 and was only produced at about 2,000 units
 1974: Model 4600 destined only to be produced and exported outside France and produced until 1978 it uses the frame of the 3800 and was produced in 4 colors (yellow, blue, orange and white); many made their ways to the USA

Moped not using a roller transmission
 1969: The 'Flash' (later renamed the 6000) is a moped with disc brakes, an axle transmission instead of the roller and with a fan cooled engine
 1972: The 'Tenor', with a chain transmission. It will be the only moped produced with an engine made by another maker. L and S series are equipped with Franco Morini gyromat engines, then GL and GS series with an Anker Laura engine. There are a few S4 version with a Franco Morini engine and a 4 speed gearbox
 2005: Model Black'n Roll S4800, a modernized version of the S3800. It is not produced under the Solex brand but rather Mopex 
 2011: Model 'e-Solex', an electric motor powered bicycle which can be folded; Model 'Solexity', an electric motor powered bicycle with an axle transmission

Electric
, the French company offered three products:

In popular culture 
In the 1958 French comedy Mon Oncle, the main character Monsieur Hulot (Jacques Tati) is a day-dreaming and impractical uncle who, while perplexed by the cutting-edge lifestyle of his sister and brother-in-law, still maintains a VéloSoleX motorized bicycle as his main transportation.

Primo Levi, in one of the autobiographic short stories in his collection The Periodic Table, mentions that he would be able switch from a bicycle to a VéloSoleX if he managed to conclude a business deal with a cosmetics manufacturer.

In the 1978 film The Boys from Brazil a German postman (played by Richard Marner) is seen riding a Velosolex.

In the 1983 film So Long, Stooge main character Bensoussan (played by Richard Anconina) rides a Velosolex around Paris.

In the 2007 film Mr. Bean's Holiday, the titular character attempts to hitchhike on an elderly man's VéloSoleX to get to Cannes, only to weigh the back of it down, and when the latter gets off to fix the problem, Mr Bean uses this as an opportunity to hijack the bike, but fails.

In the 1975 Sydney Pollack thriller Three Days of the Condor, Robert Redford rides a Solex to work in New York which sets his character as an unassuming intellectual. He thwarts two youths who try to steal it.

See also

 List of electric bicycle brands and manufacturers
 Outline of cycling
 Mobylette

References

External links 

Official website

Motorcycle manufacturers of France
Moped manufacturers
Mopeds
Cycle manufacturers of France
French brands
Motorcycles of France
Companies based in Île-de-France
Cycle manufacturers of the United States
Cycle types
Bicycle
Electric bicycles
History of cycling
Micromobility
Electric
Road cycles